Air Europa Express (legally incorporated as Aeronova, S.L.U. and previously doing business as Aeronova) is a Spanish regional low-cost airline. It is a subsidiary of Globalia (which is also the parent company of Air Europa). The airline is set to operate regional routes for Air Europa.

History
The airline was founded in Spain in 1996 as Aeronova and flew scheduled and charter flights on behalf of other companies. Aeronova also had a school offering training for pilots on the two types the airline flew, the ATR 42 and the Fairchild SA-227 Metro.

In November 2015 Globalia Corporacion, parent company of Air Europa, bought Aeronova. Later the same month it was announced that Globalia would rebrand the company as Air Europa Express to operate Air Europa's regional flights.

The new Air Europa Express is Globalia's third attempt at creating a regional subsidiary. The first was another airline with the same name which collapsed in 2001; a second airline, known as Universal Airlines, never commenced operations.

The airline commenced operations as Air Europa Express on 11 January 2016 with two daily flights between Valencia and Madrid; and one daily flight between Valencia and Palma de Mallorca; operating under the Aeronova Air operator's certificate (AOC). It was expected to get a new AOC in March 2016 to fully change the name from Aeronova to Air Europa Express. This change has not occurred yet, as the company still operates under the Aeronova legal name and AOC. Tickets for flights are only available for purchase from the Air Europa website.

As of 2016, Globalia planned to have Air Europa grow and operate long-haul flights, and have Air Europa Express for short-haul and regional routes to be more competitive and reduce costs. The airline is not a part of Air Europa and therefore the staff of the airline would be totally independent of Air Europa.

Fleet

The Air Europa Express fleet consists of the following aircraft (as of December 2022):

References

External links

Official website

Airlines of Spain
Airlines established in 1996
Spanish companies established in 1996
low-cost carriers
Companies of the Balearic Islands
Palma de Mallorca
SkyTeam affiliate members